Physominthe is a genus of flowering plants belonging to the family Lamiaceae.

Its native range is Brazil.

Species:

Physominthe longicaulis 
Physominthe vitifolia

References

Lamiaceae
Lamiaceae genera